At least two ships of the French Navy have been named Persée:

 , a  launched in 1931 and sunk in 1940.
 , an  launched in 1988 and stricken in 2009.

French Navy ship names